Pot of Gold is the nickname for a knobby, softball-sized rock in Gusev Crater on Mars. During an examination by the Mars Exploration Rover Spirit on June 25, 2004, hematite was first detected by Spirit, suggesting a watery past on Mars.

See also
 List of rocks on Mars

References

External links
Nasa's Mars Exploration Program

Rocks on Mars